The following is a list of Icelandic exonyms, that is to say names for places in Icelandic that have been adapted to Icelandic spelling rules, translated into Icelandic, or Old Norse exonyms surviving in Icelandic. Commonly pronunciation is close to in English (or native), even though not stated below, but also commonly completely different, more common if names look very different or for European/Nordic places.

See also
 List of European exonyms
 Old Norse exonyms

References

 Íslensk orðabók (2003). Edited by Mörður Árnason. 
 Icelandic Language Center:Country names

Exonyms
Exonyms
Lists of exonyms
Linguistic purism in Icelandic